The  Baltimore Brigade season was the first season for the franchise in the Arena Football League. The Brigade played at the Royal Farms Arena.

Staff

Roster

Schedule

Regular season
The 2017 regular season schedule was released on January 5, 2017.

Playoffs

Standings

References

Baltimore Brigade
Baltimore Brigade
2010s in Baltimore
2017 in sports in Maryland